Werechanie-Kolonia  is a settlement in the administrative district of Gmina Rachanie, within Tomaszów Lubelski County, Lublin Voivodeship, in eastern Poland.

References

Werechanie-Kolonia